Hormuz District is a district (bakhsh) in Qeshm County, Hormozgan Province, Iran. At the 2006 census, its population was 5,699, in 1,143 families.  The District has one city: Hormuz. The District has no rural districts (dehestan).

References 

Districts of Hormozgan Province
Qeshm County
Hormuz Island